Diamanda Galas is the eponymously titled second album by American avant-garde musician Diamanda Galás, released in 1984 by record label Metalanguage.

Content 
The album's first track, "Panoptikon" (named after Panopticon, a type of prison building designed to allow all areas of a prison to be seen from one vantage point), deals with imprisonment, isolation, torture and extreme alienation as well as homicidal mania and vengeance. It incorporates tape, electronic manipulations and distortion. It was composed by Diamanda Galas, with additional lyrics from In the Belly of the Beast by criminal and author Jack Abbott.
 
"Τραγούδια από το Αίμα Εχούv Φονός" (Song from the Blood of Those Murdered), recorded in 1981, consists solely of vocals in numerous vignettes. The recording is similar in texture to "Wild Women With Steak-Knives" from her debut album The Litanies of Satan (1982), but when the latter was hysterical and loud, "Τραγούδια" is slow, ghoulish and mournful. The singer was inspired by the tradition of Greek mourning rites, where women mourn the dead as well as seek revenge for the person responsible for the death. The words of "Τραγούδια" are sung in Greek and refer to the victims of the Greek junta regime that ruled Greece from 1967 to 1974.

Release 

Diamanda Galas was first released in 1984 by record label Metalanguage.
In October 2020 Diamanda announced the remastering of the album done by Egyptian mastering engineer Heba Kadry, eventually completed in December 2020.
In September 2021 she announced the reissue of the album on CD and LP under her label Intravenal Sound Operations with different artwork, subsequently released on October 28th 2021, after being out of print for 37 years.

Track listing

Personnel
Diamanda Galás – vocals
Production and additional personnel
Phil Brown – mastering
T.J. Eng – photography
Ed Herrmann – recording (B1)
Naomie Kremer – cover art, design
Larry Ochs – executive producer
Robert Shumaker – engineering
Richard Zvonar – tape (A1), electronics (A1), recording (B1)

Release history

References

External links 
 

Diamanda Galás albums
1984 albums
Metalanguage Records albums